Moral Township is one of fourteen townships in Shelby County, Indiana. As of the 2010 census, its population was 4,577 and it contained 1,805 housing units.

Moral Township was organized before 1840.

Geography

History
On September 9, 1969, Moral Township was the site of the deadliest air disaster in the history of Indiana.
On that date, Allegheny Airlines flight 853, a McDonnell Douglas DC-9-31 jetliner, registration N988VJ, collided in midair with a Piper PA-28 registration N7374J which was a light general aviation aircraft. After the collision, flight 853 rolled over and crashed into a soybean field near London, Indiana at over 430 mph; none of the 82 people on board survived. The pilot and sole occupant of the PA-28 were killed upon impact with the tail assembly of the DC-9. With a death toll of 83, this is the deadliest aviation disaster in the history of Indiana.

Unincorporated towns
 Brookfield
 Green Meadows
 London
 London Heights
 Pleasant View
 Sugar Creek

References

External links
 Indiana Township Association
 United Township Association of Indiana
 History of London, Indiana

Townships in Shelby County, Indiana
Townships in Indiana